Greg Rusedski was the defending champion, but lost in the second round to David Prinosil.

Tim Henman won the title, defeating Andre Agassi 6–4, 6–3, 3–6, 6–4 in the final.

Seeds
A champion seed is indicated in bold text while text in italics indicates the round in which that seed was eliminated.

Draw

Finals

Top half

Bottom half

References

External links
Draw

1998 ATP Tour
1998 Davidoff Swiss Indoors